A leadership election in the Liberal Party of Australia, the party of government in the Parliament of Australia, was held on 9 January 1968. It followed the disappearance and presumed drowning of previous leader Harold Holt, who had been declared dead on 19 December 1967. The contest was won by Senator John Gorton in a party room ballot; he was sworn in as prime minister the following day, replacing caretaker John McEwen.

Background  

Incumbent party leader Harold Holt sensationally disappeared while swimming at Cheviot Beach near Portsea on the Mornington Peninsula of Victoria on 17 December 1967. William McMahon, the incumbent Deputy Leader of the Liberal Party was assumed to be his probable successor, however, John McEwen, the interim Prime Minister and leader of the Country Party (the junior Coalition partner), announced that he and his party would not serve in a government led by McMahon. McMahon subsequently withdrew. McEwen himself had been encouraged to remain Prime Minister on a more permanent basis but to do so would have required him to defect and lead the Liberals, an option he had never contemplated.

Candidates
 Les Bury, Minister for Labour and National Service, Member for Wentworth
 John Gorton, Minister for Education and Science and Leader of the Government in the Senate, Senator for Victoria
 Paul Hasluck, Minister for External Affairs, Member for Curtin
 Billy Snedden, Minister for Immigration, Member for Bruce

Potential candidates who declined to run
 Allen Fairhall, Minister for Defence, Member for Paterson
 William McMahon, incumbent Deputy Leader, Treasurer of Australia, Member for Lowe
 John McEwen, interim Prime Minister. Although leader of the Country Party, McEwen was encouraged to stay on a Prime Minister on a permanent basis which would have required him to defect and lead the Liberals, which he wasn't willing to do.

Results

The following table gives the ballot results:

Aftermath
McMahon was re-elected unopposed as deputy Liberal leader. To date, Gorton is the only Australian Senator to be sworn in as Prime Minister; he would subsequently win Holt's vacant seat of Higgins at a by-election. Hasluck was later nominated and accepted the position of Governor-General from Gorton in 1969 and Snedden became party leader in December 1972. Bury later served as Treasurer of Australia under both Gorton and McMahon respectively.

See also
 Other leadership ballots held following the death of a prime minister:
 1939 United Australia Party leadership election
 1945 Australian Labor Party leadership election
 Gorton Government

References

Liberal Party of Australia leadership spills
Liberal Party of Australia leadership election
Liberal Party of Australia leadership election
Liberal Party of Australia leadership election